Calyptommatus nicterus is a species of Squamata in the family spectacled tegus. They are found in The Neo-tropics of Brazil. They rely on running to move around.  This is species of lizard in the family Gymnophthalmidae. It is endemic to Brazil.

References

Calyptommatus
Reptiles of Brazil
Endemic fauna of Brazil
Reptiles described in 1991
Taxa named by Miguel Trefaut Rodrigues